Viscount Butler of Tulleophelim, in the County of Carlow, was a title in the Peerage of Ireland. It was created on 4 August 1603 for Theobald Butler, the son of Sir Edmund Butler of Cloughgrenan, second son of James Butler, 9th Earl of Ormond (see Earl of Ormonde for earlier history of the family). He later served as Lord Lieutenant of Carlow. The title became extinct on his death in 1613. Tulleophelim (or Tullowphelim) is a civil parish located in County Carlow. The  parish contains the town of Tullow.

Viscount Butler of Tulleophelim (1605)
Theobald Butler, 1st Viscount Butler of Tulleophelim (–1613)

See also
Earl of Ormond (Ireland)
Butler dynasty

References

External links
 Library Ireland: Irish Local Names Explained

Extinct viscountcies in the Peerage of Ireland
Noble titles created in 1605
Tull